Eyewitness Books (called Eyewitness Guides in the UK) is a series of educational nonfiction books. They were first published in Great Britain by Dorling Kindersley in 1988. The series now has over 160 titles on a variety of subjects, such as dinosaurs, Ancient Egypt, flags, chemistry, music, the solar system, film, and William Shakespeare. According to Dorling Kindersley, over 50 million copies have been sold in 36 languages.

The books are often noted for their numerous photographs and detailed illustrations, which are always set against a white background. Describing the series in Booklist, Michael Cart wrote, "What DK did—with almost revolutionary panache—was essentially to reinvent nonfiction books by breaking up the solid pages of gray type that had previously been their hallmark, reducing the text to bite-size, nonlinear nuggets that were then surrounded by pictures that did more than adorn—they also conveyed information. Usually full color, they were so crisply reproduced they "seemed to leap off the page.""

Some titles were later adapted into a television series, with theme music composed by Guy Michelmore.

List of books in the series
The series includes:

† originally published as part of the Eyewitness Science series.

‡ originally published as part of the Eyewitness Art series.

Other series
Dorling Kindersley also produced a number of other book series under the Eyewitness banner:
 Eyewitness Anthologies: 3-in-1 compilations centred around a common theme - Ancient Civilizations, Ancient Egyptians, American Peoples, Knights & Castles, Rocks, Fossils & Gems, and Sharks, Whales & Dolphins. Later expanded to 6-in-1 compilations - Animal Kingdom, Living World, and Science Explorer.
 Eyewitness Art: 14 titles published between 1992-95. 8 titles were republished as part of the main Books/Guides series in 1998; the remaining books which weren't were -  Colour, Composition, Gauguin, Looking at Paintings, Post-Impressionism, and Sculpture.
 Eyewitness Companions
 Eyewitness Explorers
 Eyewitness Project Books
 Eyewitness Project Pack
 Eyewitness Science: 16 titles published between 1992-95. They were republished as part of the main Books/Guides series in 1998.
 Eyewitness Travel Guides: They are known for their photography and illustrated city street plans.  Places covered by Eyewitness Travel Guides include Philadelphia paired with the Pennsylvania Dutch Country, California, Florida, the Southern United States, New England, Germany, Tokyo, Hawaii, Sweden, Alaska, New Orleans, Paris, India, Arizona and the Grand Canyon, Canada, Great Britain, Las Vegas, Washington, D.C., Chicago, China,  Malaysia, Mexico, Singapore, Kenya and many others.
 Eyewitness Visual Dictionaries
 Eyewitness Workbooks
 Pocket Eyewitness
 Smithsonian Eyewitness Explorer
 The Eyewitness Atlas of the World

In additional to the book series DK also produced several tie-in ranges:
 Eyewitness DVD
 Eyewitness Kits
 Eyewitness Video

DK Multimedia produced a number CD-ROMs to accompany the series, titles included Eyewitness Children's Encyclopaedia, Eyewitness Encyclopaedia of Science, Eyewitness Encyclopaedia of Space and the Universe, Eyewitness History of the World, Eyewitness Photo Gallery, Eyewitness Virtual Reality, and Eyewitness World Atlas.

Notes

External links
 official website
 also see Eyewitness Travel Guides

Non-fiction books
Series of non-fiction books
DK (publisher) books